Joe Lee is an unincorporated community in Bell County, in the U.S. state of Texas. According to the Handbook of Texas, only 2 people lived in the community in 2000. It is located within the Killeen-Temple-Fort Hood metropolitan area.

History
Robertson's Colony member Jefferson Reed bought a plot of land for the community and named it Mud Springs, most likely because a hot spring in the area provided water for cattle to drink and kept the area muddy. The first settlers came to the community in the 1830s. Reed's daughter, Millie Reed McLean, renamed it Joe Lee in 1912 for Joe Reed and Lee Underwood, the two main business owners in the community; Joe Reed was a store owner and may have been one of her family members, while Underwood was a blacksmith. There were several scattered homes, a church, and a cemetery in Joe Lee in 1948. It then started to decline, but the County Line Baptist church was still in operation in 1989. There are two cemeteries located near the church, both named Reed and McLean. Its population was 2 from 1990 through 2000. The cemeteries are maintained by descendants of the original settlers.

Geography
Sunshine Road passes through the community.

Education
In 1903, Joe Lee had a school with two teachers and 83 students and sat on land that Jefferson Reed donated for it to be built on sometime after the 1830s. It joined the Rogers Independent School District in 1958. It had a school in 1948. It was built around the 1870s and one of the two teachers was W.C. Sypert. Today, the community continues to be served by the Rogers ISD.

References

Unincorporated communities in Texas
Unincorporated communities in Bell County, Texas